Gerta Keller (born 7 March 1945) is a geologist and paleontologist who contests the Alvarez hypothesis that the impact of the Chicxulub impactor, or another large celestial body, directly caused the Cretaceous–Paleogene extinction event. Keller maintains that such an impact predates the mass extinction and that Deccan volcanism and its environmental consequences were the most likely major cause, but possibly exacerbated by the impact.

Early life and education 
Keller was raised in Switzerland on a dairy farm, the sixth of 12 children. She grew up in poverty. In the one-room schoolhouse where she was educated, boys were given training in math and science while girls were taught cooking and cleaning, the skills they would need to be proper housewives. Her hunger for knowledge led her to read the textbooks assigned to her elder siblings, and she would prepare summaries of the material for her brothers and sisters.

She attended a vocational school starting at age 14 and learned sewing. There she organized a protest against rules that required female students to wear skirts, as she rode her bicycle three miles each way to school and wanted to be able to protect herself from the cold. The female students won the right to wear pants from then on.

After receiving her vocational certificate at age 17, she went to work for Pierre Cardin, where she was paid the equivalent of 25 cents per hour to sew luxury gowns that would sell for as much as $1,000 for which she was paid $12. She traveled around the world, learning English and working in England, followed by travel to North Africa, Spain and Australia. She survived being shot in a bank robbery in Australia in 1965, despite awakening in a hospital intensive care unit to find a priest pressing her to confess, telling her that she was going to die.

After ending up in San Francisco in 1968, Keller was "freaked out" by the shots and tear gas launched at student protests; she chose to focus on education and took a high school equivalency exam. She received her undergraduate degree at San Francisco State University and received a doctorate in geology and paleontology from Stanford University in 1978.

Paleontology 
After earning her doctorate, Keller worked for the United States Geological Survey and Stanford. She came to Princeton University in 1984 and after a few years started studying the Cretaceous–Paleogene boundary (K–T boundary), the geological signature of the Cretaceous–Paleogene extinction event. Keller's research has led her to conclude that the Chicxulub asteroid impact, the leading hypothesized cause for the Cretaceous–Paleogene extinction event, predates the event to the degree that it could not have been the sole cause. "I'm sure the day after, they had a headache," Keller states, further stating that "we vastly overestimate the damage to the environment and to life that this Chicxulub impact had".

The main evidence for the Alvarez hypothesis that the Chicxulub impact resulted in the Cretaceous–Paleogene extinction event, supported by earth sciences consensus, comes from the presence around the world of shocked quartz granules, glass spherules and tektites embedded in a layer of clay with extremely high levels of iridium, all signs of an asteroid impact. Supporters of the Alvarez hypothesis have concluded that the sandstone is the result of a massive tsunami caused by the Chicxulub impact that sandwiched the sand between the shocked quartz layer and the iridium clay. Keller's analysis of the strata between the spherules and iridium clay concludes that the material was laid down over as much as 300,000 years based on signs of plankton, worms and weathering found on the intervening material.

Selected publications

References

External links 
 "Gerta Keller Research website"
 "Keller's faculty page from princeton.edu"
 "Chicx comes home to roost", Geoscientist Online, June 18, 2007
 "Impact Factor", Geoscientist Online, June 18, 2007

20th-century American geologists
American paleontologists
Swiss paleontologists
1945 births
Living people
20th-century Swiss women scientists
Women geologists
Women paleontologists
Princeton University faculty
San Francisco State University alumni
San Francisco State University faculty
Stanford University alumni
21st-century American geologists
20th-century American women scientists
21st-century American women scientists
American women academics